Sant'Egidio alla Vibrata is a town and comune in province of Teramo, in the Abruzzo region of central  Italy, located in the Vibrata river valley.

References 

Cities and towns in Abruzzo